Pigeon is an unincorporated community in Roane County, West Virginia, United States.

The community was named after nearby Pigeon Run.

References

Unincorporated communities in Roane County, West Virginia
Unincorporated communities in West Virginia